Héctor Santiago Armenteros Ruiz (born 1944) is an artist who has been involved in theater in Cuba, before and after the Cuban Revolution, and in the United States.

Biography
Santiago has worked as an actor, playwright, director, choreographer, dancer, and puppeteer. Born in Havana, Cuba, in 1944, he graduated from the Cuban National Dramatist School after studying literature at the University of Havana. In 1959 he cofounded the Children's Theatrical Movement in Cuba. The writer Virgilio Piñera was his literature professor and intimate friend throughout those years.

In 1965 Santiago was accused of antisocial behavior. Five years later he was arrested, and his literary works were seized by the government. He was sentenced to three years' service in UMAP (Military Units to Aid Production), a type of forced labor camp where political dissidents were made to work in inhumane conditions. In 1979 he left Cuba for Spain. Santiago was eventually able to move to New York, where he resides today.

Santiago has been active in promoting HIV awareness in New York City. He has shown a strong desire to portray the social and human impacts of the disease, which was a theme in his plays throughout the 1980s. He once said, "As a human being, I have tried to bring light to these dark times and unflaggingly struggled so that man does not become man's wolf."

Many of his plays have been performed in both Cuba and the United States. His short stories, essays, and plays have been published and translated into English, French, and Catalan. His play Vida y pasión de La Peregrina (Life and Passion of the Pilgrim) was awarded the University of Florida's Golden Letters Award, and its world premiere took place during the International Hispanic Theatre Festival of Miami in 1998.

Works or publications

Notes and references

External links

 The Héctor Santiago papers are available at the Cuban Heritage Collection, University of Miami Libraries. This archival collection includes only a portion of his literary oeuvre, with future additions expected. The papers include scripts, essays, short stories, reviews, clippings, and theater programs. Additionally, the collection contains personal and professional correspondence, interviews, awards, and financial records. Some scripts and stories written by Santiago in the 1960s were excavated from the ground beneath a tree in Cuba where they had been buried for over twenty years. In order to preserve these original typescripts, photocopies have been made for consultation. Also of interest is a group of letters written by Santiago's fellow UMAP prisoners.
 Creator page for Héctor Santiago in the Cuban Theater Digital Archive.

1944 births
Cuban dramatists and playwrights
Cuban male writers
American male dramatists and playwrights
American dramatists and playwrights
Hispanic and Latino American dramatists and playwrights
Living people